Punk Rawk Christmas is the eleventh studio album by American rock band MxPx released on December 1, 2009. The album contains 10 tracks originally recorded and released each year from 1998 to 2008 and sent to MxPx's fan club members as CD singles and later as digital downloads. The album contains some previously released holiday music as well as four previously unreleased tracks that were collected following fan requests to release the material in a collection.

Release and Promotion

In 2009, following ten years of limited edition Christmas-themed singles and digital downloads, MxPx collected all their previous holiday material into the compilation Punk Rawk Christmas through the band's own record label Rock City Recording Company. This version of the record was released on CD and sold through Amazon as well as the band's official website. It was also made available on digital download platforms and later digital streaming platforms. Simultaneously, a limited edition 7-inch record was released under the same title, featuring two songs from the CD and two demo versions exclusive to the seven-inch.

Shortly after the album's release Mike Herrera spoke with Alternative Press and explained the song "Christmas Night of the Living Dead" was re-titled, against his knowledge, to "Christmas Night of Zombies" when it originally appeared on the 2003 A Santa Cause compilation.

In December 2018, MxPx released a new Christmas song titled "December" and concurrently removed the full length version of the Punk Rawk Christmas album from digital platforms, replacing it with an EP of the same title. This EP features December and only five other tracks found on full length version of Punk Rawk Christmas. 

A music video for the song Gimee Christmas was directed by Mark Nash and Chris Craryand. It was released on Youtube on December 5, 2007 when Gimee Christmas was original released as a single.

Track listing

Notes
 The digital only "Red" version omits the tracks "Coal" and "Questions."

Personnel 
Adapted from Punk Rawk Christmas liner notes.

All tracks are produced and engineered by MxPx, except where noted.

MxPx
 Mike Herrera – bass guitar, lead vocals
 Tom Wisniewski – guitar, backing vocals
 Yuri Ruley – drums, percussion

Additional musicians
 Jack Paker - guitar solo on "Auld Lang Syne"
 Pierre Bouvier  - lead vocals on "December"
 Emily Whitehurst  - lead vocals on "December"
 Holli Herrera – additional vocals on "Punk Rawk Christmas" 
 Cally Robinson – additional vocals on "Punk Rawk Christmas" 
 Winter Niemeyer – additional vocals on "Punk Rawk Christmas" 
 Alicia Bennet – additional vocals on "Punk Rawk Christmas" 
 John Moreland – additional vocals on "Punk Rawk Christmas" 
 Wayne Wedge – additional vocals on "Punk Rawk Christmas" 
 Mike Williams – additional vocals on "Punk Rawk Christmas" 
 Steve Walden – additional vocals on "Punk Rawk Christmas" 
 Jeff Turner – additional vocals on "So This is Christmas" 
 Jake Turner – additional vocals on "So This is Christmas"
 Oliver Peck – additional vocals on "Auld Lang Syne"
 Mike Moen – additional vocals on "Auld Lang Syne"
 Ryan Mattes – additional vocals on "Auld Lang Syne"

Artwork
 Joe Hamming & Michelle Herrera – cover design
 Joe Hamming, Gabe Connor & Jered Scott  – layout
 Jered Scott  – photography

Production
 Stephen Egerton – mastering on all tracks and mixing on "Punk Rawk Christmas"
 Steve Kravac – production & engineering on "Christmas Day" and "Christmas Only Comes Once a Year"
 Mike Herrera – production & engineering on "Punk Rawk Christmas," "Coal," and "Questions" and mixing on "It's Christmas and I'm Sick," "2005," "Gimee Christmas," "Another Christmas," "Coal," "Auld Lang Syne," and "Questions"
 Jack Joseph Puid – mixing on "Another Song About Christmas"
 Jack Joseph Puid – mixing on "You're the One I Miss"
 Annette Cisnero - engineering & mixing on "Christmas Party"
 Russ-T - engineering & mixing on "Christmas Night of the Living Dead"

References

MxPx albums
Good Charlotte
Albums produced by Dave Jerden
2003 Christmas albums
Christmas albums by American artists